The following outline is provided as an overview of and topical guide to cartography:

Cartography (also called mapmaking) – study and practice of making and using maps or globes.  Maps have traditionally been made using pen and paper, but the advent and spread of computers has revolutionized cartography.

Essence of cartography 

 Atlas
 Globe
 Map
 Map collection
 Mapping of the Earth

Branches of cartography 

 Celestial cartography
 Planetary cartography

Approaches in cartography 

 Cartographic generalization
 Cartographic labeling
 Critical cartography
 Terrain cartography

Cartography by region 

 French cartography

Interdisciplinary fields involving cartography 

 Geodesy
 Geomatics
 Topography

Types of maps 

 Cartogram
 City map
 Contour map
 Dymaxion map
 Electronic map
 Fantasy map
 Geologic map
 Nautical chart
 Pictorial maps
 Planform
 Plat
 Reversed map
 Road atlas
 Street map
 Thematic map
 Topographic map
 World map

Map projections 

Map projection
 List of map projections
 Orthographic projection in cartography

History of cartography 

History of cartography
 Cartographic expeditions to Greenland
 History of geography
 Chinese geography
 List of Graeco-Roman geographers
 Geography and cartography in medieval Islam
 Majorcan cartographic school

Cartography in politics 

 Cartographic aggression
 Cartographic censorship
 Cartographic propaganda

Cartography-related organizations 
 National mapping agency
 British Cartographic Society
 Cartography and Geographic Information Society
 International Cartographic Association
 National Cartographic Center of Iran
 North American Cartographic Information Society

Persons influential in cartography 

 List of cartographers

Cartography scholars 

 Cynthia Brewer—theorist of digital cartography's design
 Edward Tufte—general information design principles

See also 
 Global Positioning System
 Navigation
 Maps

External links

 Mapping History - a learning resource from the British Library
 Geography and Maps, an Illustrated Guide, by the staff of the US Library of Congress.
 The history of cartography at the School of Mathematics and Statistics, University of St. Andrews, Scotland
 Antique Maps by Carl Moreland and David Bannister - complete text of the book, with information both on mapmaking and on mapmakers, including short biographies of many cartographers
 North American Cartographic Information Society
 Society of Cartographers supports the practising cartographer and encourages and maintains a high standard of cartographic illustration
 Concise Bibliography of the History of Cartography, Newberry Library
 UPCT : project aimed at creating a world map (a French map to begin) with voluntaries using GPS

GITTA - A webbased open content eLearning course with basic and intermediate cartography lessons based on the eLML XML framework.

 
Cartography
Cartography